Arikesari may refer to any of the following Indian kings:

 Arikesari Maravarman or Arikesari Parankusa, 7th century Pandyan king
 Arikesari I, 8th century king from the Vemulavada Chalukya dynasty
 Arikesari II, 10th century king from the Vemulavada Chalukya dynasty
 Arikesarin, 11th century Shilahara king